Pectinochromis is a monospecific genus of ray-finned fish from the subfamily Pseudoplesiopinae in the family Pseudochromidae, the dottybacks. The only species in the genus is Pectinochromis lubbocki, a small reef living dottyback from the Red Sea. This genus is the sister taxon to the genus Chlidichthys. The specific name honours the Cambridge University ichthyologist Roger Lubbock (1951–1981), in recognition of his work on the taxonomy of the subfamily Pseudoplesiopinae.

References

Pseudoplesiopinae
Taxa named by Anthony C. Gill
Taxa named by Alasdair James Edwards
Fish described in 1983
Monotypic fish genera